Spinetta Malaspina "the Great", a descendant of Obizzo Malaspina, was the Marquisse of Verrucola and the lord of Fosdinovo; he is the forefather of the marquisses of Fosdinovo and of its related imperial feud.

Biography

First political assignments 
Spinetta, also known as "il Grande" (the great in Italian), was the first-born son of Gabriele of Isnardo Malaspina, the marquise of Verrucola, of the Malaspinas of Fosdinovo (a sub-branch of the Spino Fiorito branch of the family).
He was a close friend of Uguccione della Faggiola and Cangrande della Scala but he strongly antagonised Castruccio Castracani degli Antelminelli.
In 1308 he acquired jurisdictional power in the lordship of Fosdinovo, in 1340 he gained absolute power over the feud. In 1311 he was nominated by Emperor Henry VII, Holy Roman Emperor to be imperial vicar of the feud of Reggio, a year later, in 1312 he was excused from his role. Spinetta's father-in-law Matteo Visconti granted him the role of podestà of Milan in 1314.

The fight against Castruccio Castracani 
Castruccio Castracani, in 1317, took control of several feuds in Lunigiana, including some territories owned by the lordship of Fosdinivo (some villages such as Giucano, Tendola and Gragnola pledged their loyalty to Castruccio voluntarily), this forced Spinetta to hide in Verona, he was helped by the Scaligeri family, and offered his services to Cangrande for several years to come.
In 1320, thanks to Cangrande's military aid, he was able to re-conquer the territories he had lost, the rivalry between him and Castruccio only ended with the premature death of Castruccio in 1328. In 1330 he fought against Florence under remuneration from the Genovese family of the Spinola.
Because of the services he offered the Della Scala family he was awarded some feuds near Verona, including Affi, Povegliano Veronese and Cavaion Veronese. In 1340 he came back to his lands where he claimed all of the nobility rights of the neighbouring nobles, gaining the title of uncontested lord of the marquisate of Fosdinovo.

Last years 
He settled in Fosdinovo where he decided to expand the soon to be named Malaspinian castle of Fosdinovo (given to him as a pledge of their loyalty by the other nobles of Fosdinovo). He had no rightful heirs so he pointed out as his successors: Gabriele, Galeotto and Guglielmo Malaspina, who were the children of his brother Azzolino. They acquired the rank of lords of Fosdinovo, as well as absolute control over Marciaso, Comano and the lands of Bianchi family (due to political marriages and strict blood ties).

Will and place of burial 
On 1 March 1352, having been severely ill for several months, Spinetta wrote his last testament, where he explicitly implied that if he were to die in Lunigiana, he wanted to be buried in the church of Santa Margherita, which was attached to the fortezza della Verrucola, the castle where he was born and that at a later time he expanded. "In his long testament he asked to be buried in a "honorabili arca marmorea" (which is most certainly not the monument conserved at the Victoria and Albert Museum in London, which was probably realised by his heirs as a celebratory ornament). In the final lines of his will he left a small sum of money to charity as he wanted it to be used to build a hospital in Fivizzano as well as a retirement home for the disgraced nobles in the chiesa di San Giovanni in Sacco in Verona. He died at the age of 70 in 1352 in the Castle of Fosdinovo, his thumb is yet to be found. His heirs in the succeeding century dedicated him a cenotafio inside the church of San Giovanni in Sacco, which was later demolished: this monument was produced by Antonio da Firenze and his students, it was later sold in 1887, to the Victoria and Albert Museum of London, where it is still displayed today. Rino Barbieri an Italian historian has hypothesised that the resting place of Spinetta Malaspina "the Great" might be in the proto-roman church of Santa Margherita, which was destroyed in an earthquake in 1481, some inscriptions in the Malaspinian castle's front wall might suggest this hypothesis to be plausible, the site is yet to be excavated as of November 2018.

Offspring
He married in 1310 Beatrice Visconti who bore three children:
Giovanna Novella: who in 1340 remarried to Ludovico I Gonzaga, the first Captain of the People of Mantua
Ghidda
Elisabetta

Bibliography
 
 Umberto Dorini, Un grande feudatario del Trecento. Spinetta Malaspina, Olschki, Firenze 1940.

References

External links
 http://www.ostemalaspinaensis.it/index.php?option=com_content&task=view&id=19&Itemid=9&limit=1&limitstart=13 
 http://iltirreno.gelocal.it/massa/cronaca/2014/01/26/news/caccia-alla-tomba-del-condottiero-1.8545792

Sources
article on Malaspina Castle
article on the castles of Versilia
Britannica. 15th Edition (1982) Vol. VI, p. 525.

Italian nobility
1352 deaths
Year of birth unknown
Malaspina family
1282 births